Blackstone Park Historic District is roughly bounded by the Seekonk River, Laurell Avenue, Blackstone Boulevard, and South Angell Street in Providence, Rhode Island within the Blackstone region of the East Side.

In 1886 Horace Cleveland planned the laid out of Blackstone Boulevard and it was constructed in 1894 to provide better access to nearby Swan Point Cemetery. The park in the center was planned and suggested by the Olmsted Brothers.

From 1903 to 1948 a trolley line operated down the middle of the boulevard stopping at a fieldstone shelter. After the trolley's removal, a walking path was constructed on trolley bed. The surrounding district features architecture by Howard K. Hilton and contains various 19th-century and 20th-century colonial revivals. The district was added to the National Register of Historic Places in 1998.

See also
Blackstone Boulevard Park
Blackstone Park Conservation District
Blackstone Boulevard Realty Plat Historic District
National Register of Historic Places listings in Providence, Rhode Island

References

Historic districts in Providence County, Rhode Island
Geography of Providence, Rhode Island
Historic districts on the National Register of Historic Places in Rhode Island
National Register of Historic Places in Providence, Rhode Island
Parks on the National Register of Historic Places in Rhode Island